The 2020 Calypso Lemonade 200 was the fifth stock car race of the 2020 ARCA Menards Series, the second race of the 2020 Sioux Chief Showdown, and the 16th iteration of the event. The race was held on Friday, July 3, 2020, in Brownsburg, Indiana at Lucas Oil Raceway, a  permanent oval-shaped racetrack. The race took the scheduled 200 laps to complete. At race's end, Chandler Smith of Venturini Motorsports would dominate and win his ninth and to date, final career ARCA Menards Series win and his second of the season. To fill out the podium, Sam Mayer of GMS Racing and Hailie Deegan of DGR-Crosley would finish second and third, respectively.

Background 

It includes a  oval track, a  road course (which has fallen into disrepair and is no longer used), and a  drag strip which is among the premier drag racing venues in the world. The complex receives about 500,000 visitors annually.

Entry list

Practice 
The only 45-minute practice session was held on Friday, June 3.

Qualifying 
Qualifying was held on Friday, June 3, at 5:45 PM EST. Each driver would have two laps to set a fastest time; the fastest of the two would count as their official qualifying lap.

Full qualifying results

Race results

References 

2020 ARCA Menards Series
NASCAR races at Lucas Oil Raceway at Indianapolis
July 2020 sports events in the United States
2020 in sports in Indiana